Ctiboř is a municipality and village in Tachov District in the Plzeň Region of the Czech Republic. It has about 300 inhabitants.

Administrative parts
The hamlet of Březí is an administrative part of Ctiboř.

References

Villages in Tachov District